The Hammond Ciesar All-Americans were a professional basketball team that competed in the National Basketball League. They were based in Hammond, Indiana, and played in the Hammond Civic Center for home games.

History
The team was founded in 1936 in Whiting, Indiana as the Whiting Ciesar All-Americans, where they played in the Midwest Basketball Conference. They changed their name in for the 1938–39 season to the Hammond Ciesar All-Americans, and joined the National Basketball League. They disbanded after the 1940–41 season.

References

 
Basketball teams established in 1936
1936 establishments in Indiana
1941 disestablishments in Indiana
Basketball teams disestablished in 1941
Hammond, Indiana